My Little Pony: Friendship Is Magic is an animated children's television series based on the My Little Pony toyline, created by American toy and game manufacturer Hasbro. The show also has musical elements, featuring songs performed on-screen by its characters in several episodes.

Overall, the series has featured 107 original songs over the course of its nine seasons, not including its main theme "Friendship Is Magic" and the songs from its 2017 film My Little Pony: The Movie. Almost all songs featured in the show were composed by Daniel Ingram (pictured). He also became the show's main lyricist starting with season two; other notable lyricists include Amy Keating Rogers, M.A. Larson and the series' showrunner Meghan McCarthy. Lyrics are often written or co-written by the screenwriter of the episode they are featured in.

TV series

Season 1 (2010–11)

1In case of several characters providing lead vocals, the performers are listed in the order in which their characters (of the first of their characters in case they voice several) start singing.
2Not the person usually voicing the character in songs; those are spoken vocals.
3The singer is not portraying a character.

Season 2 (2011–12)

1In case of several characters providing lead vocals, the performers are listed in the order in which their characters (of the first of their characters in case they voice several) start singing.
3The singer is not portraying a character.
4As the song only features several characters singing in harmony, there are no lead vocals per se.

Season 3 (2012–13)

1In case of several characters providing lead vocals, the performers are listed in the order in which their characters (of the first of their characters in case they voice several) start singing.
2Pinkie Pie just shouts before singing.

Season 4 (2013–14)

1In case of several characters providing lead vocals, the performers are listed in the order in which their characters (of the first of their characters in case they voice several) start singing.
2Not the person usually voicing the character in songs; those are spoken vocals.
3The singer is not portraying a character.
5Not the person usually voicing the character in songs.

Season 5 (2015)

1In case of several characters providing lead vocals, the performers are listed in the order in which their characters (of the first of their characters in case they voice several) start singing.
6Corman is credited for the guitar and mandolin parts only.
7Diamond Tiara's part in this song is for a deleted verse only.

Season 6 (2016)

1In case of several characters providing lead vocals, the performers are listed in the order in which their characters (of the first of their characters in case they voice several) start singing.
2Ensemble choir includes Nicole Oliver as Cheerliee

Season 7 (2017)

Season 8 (2018)

For the final two seasons of the show, Daniel Ingram was able to use the Nashville Scoring Orchestra to perform all of the songs.

Season 9 (2019)

Films

My Little Pony: The Movie (2017)

The six songs that Daniel Ingram wrote made use of the Nashville Scoring Orchestra for their performance.

1In case of several characters providing lead vocals, the performers are listed in the order in which their characters (of the first of their characters in case they voice several) start singing.
2Not the person usually voicing the character in songs; those are spoken vocals.
3The singer is not portraying a character.

Specials

My Little Pony: Best Gift Ever (2018)

My Little Pony: Rainbow Roadtrip (2019)

3The singer is not portraying a character.

Other

Discography

Soundtrack albums

Compilation albums

Notes

References

External links
 
 
  at Hasbro

Songs
Lists of songs by media franchise
Film and television discographies